Tschappina is a municipality in the Viamala Region in the Swiss canton of Graubünden.

History
Tschappina is first mentioned in 1396 as in Schipinen.

Geography
Of this area, 42.2% is used for agricultural purposes, while 26.8% is forested. Of the rest of the land, 1% is settled (buildings or roads) and the remainder (30%) is non-productive (rivers, glaciers or mountains).

Before 2017, the municipality was located in the Thusis sub-district, of the Hinterrhein district, after 2017 it was part of the Viamala Region. It consists of the settlements of Unter- and Ober-Tschappina, Ober Gmeind, Usser and Inner Glas.

Demographics
, 4.9% of the population was made up of foreign nationals. Over the last 10 years the population has decreased at a rate of -1.8%.

, the gender distribution of the population was 53.1% male and 46.9% female.  The age distribution, in Tschappina is; 20 people or 13.2% of the population are between 0 and 9 years old.  14 people or 9.3% are 10 to 14, and 7 people or 4.6% are 15 to 19.  Of the adult population, 8 people or 5.3% of the population are between 20 and 29 years old.  21 people or 13.9% are 30 to 39, 24 people or 15.9% are 40 to 49, and 21 people or 13.9% are 50 to 59.  The senior population distribution is 15 people or 9.9% of the population are between 60 and 69 years old, 10 people or 6.6% are 70 to 79, there are 10 people or 6.6% who are 80 to 89, and there is 1 person who is 90 to 99.

In the 2007 federal election the most popular party was the SVP which received 54.2% of the vote.  The next three most popular parties were the SPS (16.4%), the FDP (12.6%) and the CVP (9.3%).

In Tschappina about 71.6% of the population (between age 25–64) have completed either non-mandatory upper secondary education or additional higher education (either university or a Fachhochschule).

Tschappina has an unemployment rate of 0.39%.  , there were 54 people employed in the primary economic sector and about 23 businesses involved in this sector.  4 people are employed in the secondary sector and there are 2 businesses in this sector.  19 people are employed in the tertiary sector, with 7 businesses in this sector.

The historical population is given in the following table:

Languages
Most of the population speaks German (98.0%), with Romansh being second most common ( 1.3%) and Portuguese being third ( 0.7%).

References

External links
 Official website 
 

 
Municipalities of Graubünden
Ski areas and resorts in Switzerland